Colón is a town in the Venezuelan Andean state of Táchira.  This town is the shire town of the Ayacucho Municipality and, according to the 2001 Venezuelan census, the municipality has a population of 48,982.

Demographics
The Ayacucho Municipality, according to the 2001 Venezuelan census, has a population of 48,982 (up from 41,404 in 1990).  This amounts to 4.9% of Táchira's population.  The municipality's population density is 262.1 people per square mile (101.20/km2).

Government
Colón is the shire town of the Ayacucho Municipality in Táchira.  The mayor of the Ayacucho Municipality is Gabino Paz Guerrero, reelected in 2004 with 47% of the vote.  The last municipal election was held in October 2004.

Sites of interest

Religious buildings
Iglesia San Juan Bautista

Squares and parks
Plaza Bolívar
Plaza Sucre de Colón

Notable people
Ramón José Velásquez Former Interim President of Venezuela
Pedro Antonio Ríos Reyna, Venezuelan classical musician.

References

External links
ayacucho-tachira.gob.ve 
Information on the Ayacucho Municipality 
More information on the Ayacucho Municipality 

Populated places in Táchira